A scrivener is a professional scribe.

Scrivener may also refer to:

People
 Anthony Scrivener (1935–2015), English barrister
 Charles Robert Scrivener (1855–1923), Australian surveyor
 Christiane Scrivener (born 1925), French politician
 Chuck Scrivener (born 1947), former Major League Baseball shortstop
 Colin Scrivener (born 1970), Canadian football player
 Frederick Henry Ambrose Scrivener (1813–1891), English scholar of the New Testament
 Glen Scrivener (born 1967), Canadian former football player
 Jeremy Scrivener (born 1965), Australian actor
 Karen Scrivener (born 1958), English scientist
 Margaret Scrivener (1922–1997), Canadian politician
 Matthew Scrivener (1580–1609), English colonist
 Nick Scrivener (born 1970), Australian professional rugby union coach and former player

Places
 Scrivener Dam, a dam in Canberra, Australia
 Scrivener Glacier, a glacier in Antarctica

Brands and enterprises 
 Scrivener (software), a text-editing application
 Scriveners' Company, a livery company or Guild of the City of London

See also
 "Bartleby, the Scrivener", 1853 short story by Herman Melville